Reykan (also Romanized as Reykān and Rīkān; also known as Rāhkān, Raichun, Raishun, Rīchān, and Rīgān) is a village in Fathabad Rural District, in the Central District of Qir and Karzin County, Fars Province, Iran. At the 2006 census, its population was 104, in 29 families.

References 

Populated places in Qir and Karzin County